Peder Christian Hjorth (February 16 1792 – 1 January 1855) was a Norwegian politician.

He served in the Parliament of Norway during the term 1839–1841, representing the constituency Smaalenenes Amt. He made his living as a farmer.

References

1792 births
1855 deaths
Norwegian farmers
Members of the Storting
Østfold politicians